Operation PowerOFF was a 2022 joint operation by the US Federal Bureau of Investigation (FBI), the Dutch National Police Corps, and the UK National Crime Agency to close American websites offering denial-of-service attack (DDoS) for hire. The operation shut down 48 websites offering "booter" services, and six people were arrested in the United States. Multiple companies, including Cloudflare, PayPal, and DigitalOcean provided information to the police to assist in the seizure.

History
In 2018, the FBI closed down 15 DDoS websites with the Dutch National Police Corps. On December 14, resuming this collaboration, the FBI and Department of Justice announced that they had closed multiple websites offer DDoS-for-hire services. The FBI claimed that these websites offered services designed to slow down websites relating to gaming. The FBI also noted that these services had heavy use, claiming that "Quantum", one of the seized services, was used to launch 50,000 attacks. After the shutdown, multiple law enforcement agencies collaborating with the FBI declared they would place advertisements on search engines, such as Google, that would educate the public on the legality of DDoS services.

Aftermath
Six Americans were arrested by the FBI's offices in the Central District of California and District of Alaska. Three of the people arrested were from Florida, one from Texas, one from Hawaii, and one from New York. The FBI asks that users with information related to the attacks contact their offices for tips and information related to the seized sites.

References 

Law enforcement operations
Federal Bureau of Investigation operations
2022 in computing
Denial-of-service attacks